The Yemeni Congregation for Reform, frequently called al-Islah, is a Yemeni Islamist party founded in 1990 by Abdullah ibn Husayn al-Ahmar, Ali Mohsen al-Ahmar, Abdul Majeed al-Zindani, with Ali Saleh's blessing. The first article of Islah basic law defines it as "a popular political organization that seeks reform of all aspects of life on the basis of Islamic principles and teachings".

Islah is more of a loose coalition of tribal and religious elements than a political party. Its origins are in the Islamic Front, a Muslim Brotherhood affiliated militia funded by Saudi Arabia to combat the Marxist National Democratic Front. The Islamic Front regrouped after the unification of Yemen in 1990 under the banner of the Islah Party with considerable financial backing from Saudi Arabia. Islah has long been identified as a client of Saudi Arabia. In its official website, Islah summarizes its foreign policy agenda; one of five major goals is "strengthening our country’s relations with sister Kingdom of Saudi Arabia and the countries of the Gulf Cooperation Council."
 
Islah differs from most other Arab Islamists. The party combines tribal influences along with those of the Yemeni Muslim Brotherhood. As a result, it faces deep internal divisions on key issues. Its fractious composition prevents it from developing a clear parliamentary platform, forcing it instead to balance tribal and political interests, differing interpretations of the party’s Islamist platform, and both loyalist and opposition constituencies. Given its origin as an alliance, Islah's ideology remains vague and its political platform ambiguous. Islah could be best described as a conservative party that promotes tribal and religious values.

The Joint Meeting Parties came into existence in 2003 when Islah and the socialist party joined three other smaller parties to establish a joint opposition to the ruling general people's congress. At the last legislative elections, 27 April 2003, the party won 22.6% of the popular vote and 46 out of 301 seats.

The party is a part of the Muslim Brotherhood, which is considered a terrorist organization by the governments of Bahrain, Egypt, Russia, Syria, Saudi Arabia and United Arab Emirates. However, since the civil war in Yemen, Saudi Arabia has forged closer relations with Al-Islah.

Foundation
The party was created on 13 September 1990 in Sana'a, Yemen, by the tribal sheikh Abdullah Al Ahmar.

General structure, leadership
Al-Islah has been described as consisting of three components. The first is the political faction, Yemen’s Muslim Brotherhood, led by Mohammed Qahtan. The second is the tribal confederacy which was led by top tribal chief Abdullah Al Ahmar until his death in 2007 at which time he was succeeded by his son Sadeq. The third is the Salafi movement, led by the country’s most prominent Sunni religious scholar, Abdul Majeed al-Zindani. Muhammad Al-Yadomi succeeded Al Ahmar as the head of the party following his death on 28 December 2007.

In the 2003 parliamentary election, Al-Islah won 46 seats. , 13 of Al-Islah's parliament members were women, including human rights activist and Nobel laureate Tawakel Karman, who created the activist group Women Journalists Without Chains in 2005 and became the first Yemeni and Arab woman to win the Nobel Peace Prize in 2011. On 5 February 2018, she was suspended from the party.

As of 2014 the party was the second biggest political party after the General People’s Congress (GPC).

Publications
The party has two major media outlets, Al Sahwa, an Arabic daily newspaper, and Suhail TV. The latter is owned by Hamid al-Ahmar, a relative of the party's founder.

Relations with Saudi Arabia and the UAE
The party was blacklisted by Saudi Arabia in March 2014 due to its ties to the Muslim Brotherhood. Since the death of former King Abdullah bin Abdulaziz, Saudi Arabia has repaired relations with Al-Islah, due to their role in fighting the Houthis during the Yemeni Civil War. In December 2017, Islah leaders Al-Yidoumi and Al-Anisi met with the crown princes of Saudi Arabia and Abu Dhabi (part of the UAE) in the Saudi capital Riyadh to discuss the Yemeni war. Before that, the UAE had publicly opposed Al-Islah, and it was later claimed that the UAE hired American mercenaries to assassinate people like Al-Islah leader Mayo. In December 2018, it was reported that Islamist political parties like Al-Islah and jihadi militant groups like Al-Qaeda and Islamic State (ISIS) were the main targets of the UAE, with the Houthis no longer being regarded as the greatest enemy of the UAE, with the Saudis being unable to do anything about it.

Electoral history

House of Representatives elections

See also
Houthi movement
Southern Movement
Yemeni Crisis (2011–present)

References

External links
Official web site  

1990 establishments in Yemen
Islamic political parties in Yemen
Islamism in Yemen
Muslim Brotherhood
Organizations of the Arab Spring
Organizations of the Yemeni Crisis (2011–present)
Political parties established in 1990
Political parties in Yemen
Salafi groups
Saudi Arabia–Yemen relations
Sunni Islamic political parties
Yemeni Revolution